Liebe, Babys und ein großes Herz is a German television series.

External links
 

2006 German television series debuts
2012 German television series endings
German medical television series
German-language television shows
ZDF original programming